"Vocab" is a song written and performed by the hip-hop group, Fugees. "Vocab" was issued as the third single from the group's debut album, Blunted on Reality. The song was co-produced by Pras and Wyclef Jean. Similar to the group's previous single, Nappy Heads, "Vocab" is best-known for its remixes, which were both co-produced by Salaam Remi and the Fugees. The song peaked at number 22 on the Billboard rap chart in 1995.

Chart positions

Music video

The official music video for "Vocab" was directed by Max Malkin. The video was partially filmed in East Harlem in 1993.

References

External links
 

1992 songs
1994 singles
Fugees songs
Ruffhouse Records singles
Song recordings produced by Wyclef Jean
Song recordings produced by Pras
Songs written by Lauryn Hill
Songs written by Wyclef Jean
Songs written by Pras